Jagodowo  is a village in the administrative district of Gmina Osielsko, within Bydgoszcz County, Kuyavian-Pomeranian Voivodeship, in north-central Poland.

The village has a population of 47.

References

Jagodowo